Zapatista(s) may refer to:

 Liberation Army of the South, a guerrilla force led by Emiliano Zapata in the Mexican Revolution 1911–1920
 Zapatismo, the armed movement identified with the ideas of Emiliano Zapata
 Zapatista Army of National Liberation, a group that controls territory in Chiapas, Mexico
 Neozapatismo, the political philosophy and practice of the Zapatista Army of National Liberation
 Rebel Zapatista Autonomous Municipalities in Chiapas

See also
Emiliano Zapata (1879–1919), Mexican revolutionary